"Reflections of My Life" was a 1969/1970 hit single for the Scottish band, Marmalade. It was written by their lead guitarist Junior Campbell, and singer Dean Ford (born Thomas McAleese). Released in late 1969, it was the band's first release on Decca following an earlier spell at CBS.

The song went on to chart worldwide, reaching number three in the UK in 1969, No.10 in the US in 1970 on the Billboard Hot 100, and No.7 on the Cash Box Top 100. Initial sales were significant in both countries, and the one million mark was reported in November 1971, when the group was presented with a gold disc for global sales.
The track featured a lead vocal by Ford backed by vocal harmonies, and included a reverse tape guitar solo (backmasking) by Campbell.

"Reflections of My Life" has produced sales of over two million units.  In 1998 the writers were awarded a Special Citation of Achievement by the BMI for attaining radio broadcast performances in excess of one million in the US alone.

Recording

The recording took place over three days in October 1969 at Decca Studios 2 and 1 in West Hampstead London with band members Graham Knight on bass, Alan Whitehead on drums, Pat Fairley on acoustic guitar, and Junior Campbell on keyboards and electric guitars. Dean Ford sang lead vocal and Junior Campbell and Graham Knight provided harmony vocals.

The added brass and strings were orchestrated by Keith Mansfield. "Reflections" was released 14 November 1969 in the UK. The Decca staff recording engineers were Bill Price and Peter Rynston.

Structure
The song structure is unusual in that the intro, verses and choruses all share the same 8 bar sequence: G major B minor E minor G7 C major B minor A minor D7 repeated throughout.

Guitar solo

The guitar solo in "Reflections of My Life", often referred to as "reverse" guitar solo, was a sixteen bar (measure) sequence featured in the recording by Junior Campbell, the band's lead guitarist.

The song is in the key of G major and the solo was recorded thus:

The first 4 bars were recorded as normal, with Campbell playing a long “G” note, tied over from the last beat of bar 3, through bar 4, with slight feedback sustaining the long note.

The eight track tape was then turned over, and Campbell played against the reverse sound of the track, including his initial first four bars ensuring that he played another long “G” near the same point which could be cross-faded against the original – the tape was then turned over to normal setup, and he selected just 4 bars from the reverse recording which are bars 4–7 inclusive – this was cross-faded with the original at bar 4 – he then picked up from bar 8 through to bar 16 as normal, so in fact, only 4 bars are actually “reversed”.

The solo was played on his left-hand Gibson Stereo ES355 using a Sound City stack.

Chart performance

Weekly charts

Year-end charts

Cover versions
The Australian band Flake recorded the song in 1970.  It charted regionally in Adelaide and Sydney, where it reached No.10; as well as settling in as a top 40 hit on the Go-Set National Top 60 in January 1971. Marmalade's original had peaked at No.47.
The Hong Kong band Blue Jeans, with a Cantonese lyric in 1987.
Ruddy Thomas included a reggae rendition on his 1983 album Reggae By Ruddy Thomas. It was a duet with Barry Biggs, who also arranged and co-produced the song. It was released as a single in 1983 and reached No.25 in the Netherlands.
Kevin Rowland, on his 1999 album My Beauty.

In popular culture
The recording has resurfaced on various film soundtracks as diverse as the pre-election 1998 UK Government TV campaign in support of the Good Friday Agreement to Inside Deep Throat, the documentary movie covering the life of Linda Lovelace.
In October 2008, "Reflections of My Life" was used as the closing end titles soundtrack to an episode of the American version of the British television drama, Life on Mars. 
In December 2009, the song was also used at the end of the pilot of the television programme, Men of a Certain Age. 
It was also a notable part of the soundtrack of the 2011 HBO film Cinema Verite starring James Gandolfini, Diane Lane, and Tim Robbins. 
A portion of the song can be found in the closing credits of the 2011 comedy movie, Hall Pass. In 2020, a significant portion of the song was used in the HBO Max Seth Rogen film An American Pickle.
The original recording can be found on Fine Cuts – The Best of Marmalade Salvo MDCD26, 2-CD compilation, and on various earlier releases on Sanctuary Records compilations, including Marmalade: The Ultimate Collection and Rainbow – The Decca Years. It is also available on Rhino Records', Super Hits of the '70s: Have a Nice Day, Vol. 2.

References

External links
 An Analysis of “Reflections of My Life” by Marmalade
 

1969 songs
1969 singles
Decca Records singles
London Records singles
Marmalade (band) songs
Pop ballads
Songs written by Junior Campbell